Yodpiman Riverwalk, also written as Yodpiman River Walk, usually shortened to Yodpiman is a good atmosphere community mall on the diversion of Chao Phraya River near Memorial Bridge. Yodpiman can be considered as part of Pak Khlong Talat, a largest and oldest flower market in Bangkok and Thailand.

It is located behind Pak Khlong Talat, the building has three floors in a colonial style with serving restaurants, cafés, bakeries, banks, souvenir shops, clothing stores, and there is a terrace for walks and sightseeing along the banks of the Chao Phraya River. From this terrace, looking at the opposite (Thonburi side) you can see Santa Cruz Church, ubosot (ordination hall) of Wat Prayurawongsawat and Wat Kalayanamitr,  three Thai-style white pavilions that is the head office of City Law Enforcement Department, Wichai Prasit Fort and prang (Khmer-style pagoda) of Wat Arun clearly.

Formerly, its location was once a warehouse and an old port that is around 50–60 years old, include used to be a flower market since 1961. Until in early 2016, it has been upgraded to a new landmark of Rattanakosin Island and Chao Phraya River. 

Moreover, Yodpiman Riverwalk is also a pier for Chao Phraya Express Boat with designated pier number N6/1, it can be considered as a pier in the middle between Rajinee (N7) and Memorial Bridge Piers (N6). From here you can take a boat to other nearby attractions such as Tha Tian, Wat Pho etc.

See more
River City Shopping Complex
Asiatique: The Riverfront

References

External links

Phra Nakhon district
Shopping malls in Bangkok
Tourist attractions in Bangkok
2016 establishments in Thailand
Shopping malls established in 2016
Buildings and structures on the Chao Phraya River